ERIH may refer to:
 European Route of Industrial Heritage
ERIH PLUS, previously ERIH or European Reference Index for the Humanities

See also
 includes various people with forename or surname Erih